ψ Leonis (Latinised as Psi Leonis, abbreviated to ψ Leo or psi Leo), is a solitary star located in the zodiac constellation of Leo, to the east-northeast of Regulus. It is faintly visible to the naked eye with an apparent visual magnitude of 5.38. Based upon stellar parallax measurements, it is located around 95 light years from the Sun. At that distance, the visual magnitude of the star is diminished by an absorption factor of 0.3 due to interstellar dust.

Psi Leonis is an evolved red giant star with a stellar classification of M2 IIIab. It shines with a luminosity over 900 times that of the Sun from a relatively cool outer atmosphere that has an effective temperature of 3,756. It is a suspected variable star with a measured brightness variation of 0m.018. Psi Leonis has a magnitude 11.63 visual companion at an angular separation of 281.60 arcseconds along a position angle of 139°, as of 2000.

References

M-type giants
Suspected variables
Leo (constellation)
Leonis, Psi
3866
084194
047723
Leonis, 16
Durchmusterung objects